Robert Miles (1969–2017) was a Swiss-Italian record producer, composer, musician and DJ.

Robert Miles is also the name of:

 Robert Miles (sociologist), British scholar and former professor of sociology.
 Rob Miles (born 1957), British academic and computer scientist.
 Robert Miles (cricketer) (1846–1930), English amateur cricketer.
 Robert Miles (judge), judge of the High Court of England and Wales.
 Robert Miles (rugby league) (born 1976), former Australian professional rugby league player.
 Robert E. Miles (1925–1992), white-supremacist leader from Michigan.